Bilaq (also Romanized as Bīlāq, Bailāq, and Beylāq; also known as Bīlāgh) is a village in Rostaq Rural District, in the Central District of Khomeyn County, Markazi Province, Iran. At the 2006 census, its population was 73, in 23 families.

References 

Populated places in Khomeyn County